Billy's Rival is a 1914 American silent short film directed by Sydney Ayres, starring  William Garwood and Louise Lester.

Cast
 William Garwood as Billy Manning
 Louise Lester as His wife
 Vivian Rich as Mary, his wife
 Jack Richardson as Mary's father
 Harry von Meter as Thomas Day
 Charlotte Burton as Mrs. Day, his invalid mother

External links

1914 films
American silent short films
American black-and-white films
Films with screenplays by Anita Loos
Films directed by Sydney Ayres
1910s American films